Abul Hasnat is an Arabic phrase meaning a servant of beautiful. It may refer to:

 Abul Hasnat Muhammad Qamaruzzaman (1926–1975), Bangladeshi politician and government minister
 Abul Hasanat Abdullah (born 1944), Bangladeshi politician from Barisal
 Abul Hasnat (1955–2019), an Indian physician and politician
 Abul Hasnat Md. Abdul Hai (died 2010), Bangladeshi politician from Sunamganj
 Abul Hasnat (barrister) (c. 1940–2022), Bangladeshi politician and lawyer
 Abul Hasnat Khan (1946–2021), Indian politician of Communist Party of India (Marxist)
 Abul Hasnat (Murshidabad politician), Indian politician of Indian National Congress
 Abul Hasnat (writer and editor) (1945–2020), Bangladeshi writer and editor